Macaranga peltata is a heliophyllous evergreen plant found in Western Ghats of India and Sri Lanka. A crimson colored resin called "macaranga gum" is obtained from this plant. Many parts of the plant are used for ayurvedic medicine in both countries.

Description
Grayish bark is smooth in texture. Leaves are simple and alternately arranged, peltate, orbicular-ovate, apex is acuminate, and palmately 8 to 9-nerved. Unisexual flowers are dioecious. One-seeded fruit is a globose capsule.

References

Cytotoxic prenylated flavonoids from Macaranga indica

indica
Flora of China
Flora of tropical Asia
Dioecious plants